44 may refer to: 
 44 (number)
 one of the years 44 BC, AD 44, 1944, 2044

Military
44M Tas, a Hungarian medium/heavy tank design of World War II
44M Tas Rohamlöveg, a Hungarian tank destroyer design of World War II, derived from the 44M Tas tank

Others
"Forty-Four", a blues standard
Forty-Fours, a group of islands in the Chatham Archipelago
Forty Four, Arkansas, an unincorporated community in Izard County, Arkansas
44 (album), a 2020 quadruple album by Joel Plaskett
"44", a song by Bad Gyal featuring Rema from Warm Up
"Forty Four", a song by Karma to Burn from Appalachian Incantation
.44 caliber, a family of firearms and firearm cartridges
.44 Special, a revolver cartridge
.44 Magnum, a large revolver cartridge evolved from the .44 special